This is a list of airports in Ecuador, sorted by location.



Airports 

Airport names shown in bold indicate the airport has scheduled service on commercial airlines.

See also 
 Ecuadorian Air Force (Fuerza Aérea Ecuatoriana)
 Transportation in Ecuador
 List of airports by ICAO code: S#SE - Ecuador
 Wikipedia:WikiProject Aviation/Airline destination lists: South America#Ecuador

References 
 Dirección General de Aviación Civil del Ecuador: in English and Spanish
 
 
  - includes IATA codes
  - ICAO codes, airport data
  - IATA and ICAO codes

Footnotes

Ecuador
 
Airports
Airports
Ecuador